The 2015/16 FIS Cup (ski jumping) was the 11th FIS Cup season in ski jumping for men and the 4th for ladies.

Other competitive circuits this season included the World Cup, Grand Prix, Continental Cup, FIS Race and Alpen Cup.

Calendar

Men

Ladies

Overall standings

Men

Ladies

References

2015 in ski jumping
2016 in ski jumping
FIS Cup (ski jumping)